Sale Sharks Women are a women's rugby union club based in Sale, Greater Manchester, England. They were founded in 2020 as the women's team of Premiership Rugby side Sale Sharks. They currently compete in the Premier 15s, the highest division of women's rugby union in England.

History 
On 30 January 2020, Premiership Rugby side Sale Sharks announced that they would apply for place in the Premier 15s League ahead of the 2020–21 season, committing £1 million over a three-year period to their women's section. Their application was successful, and on 6 April, Sale Sharks Women were entered into the league alongside Exeter Chiefs Women, replacing Waterloo and Richmond.

Sale's application to be a part of the Premier 15s from the 2023/24 season onwards was initially rejected by the RFU. This left the Premier 15s with no club north of Loughborough Lightning, however, the club would receive conditional approval from the RFU in February 2023 to continue in the league.

Home ground 
Sale Sharks Women will play their home matches at Heywood Road (currently named CorpAcq Stadium for sponsorship reasons) in Sale, Greater Manchester, and train at Carrington Lane, the Sale Sharks High Performance Centre owned by Sale FC.

Season summaries

Current players 
As of 18 November 2022

Notable Players 
The following are players which have represented their countries at the Rugby World Cup whilst playing for Sale Sharks:

Club staff

References

External links 
 Sale Sharks Women on Twitter 
 Sale Sharks Women on Facebook 
 Sale Sharks Women on Instagram

Sale Sharks
Women's rugby union teams in England
Women's sports teams in England